Several ships of the United States Navy have been named USS Sparrow:

 , a coastal minesweeper acquired in 1940.
  was a patrol vessel in commission from 1918 to 1919
 , a coastal minehunter

United States Navy ship names